"Dirty Vibe" is a single by American record producers Skrillex and Diplo, featuring vocals from G-Dragon and CL. It was released on December 15, 2014, as the fourth single from Skrillex's debut studio album Recess (2014). The single charted at number 19 on Billboards Hot Dance/Electronic Songs.

Music video
An official music video was premiered on Red Bull's official page on December 15, 2014. It was released later on YouTube. The video was directed by Lil’ Internet.

Track listing

Personnel
 Sonny "Skrillex" Moore – production
 Thomas Wesley "Diplo" Pentz – production
 G-Dragon – writer, vocals, rapper
 CL – writer, vocals, rapper

Chart performance

References

2014 singles
2014 songs
Skrillex songs
G-Dragon songs
Song recordings produced by Skrillex
Song recordings produced by Diplo
Songs written by Skrillex
Songs written by Diplo
Songs written by G-Dragon
Songs written by Teddy Park
Big Beat Records (American record label) singles
Atlantic Records singles
Asylum Records singles